R. Ray Peterson (born May 3, 1959) is a former Republican member of the Wyoming Senate, representing the 19th district from 2005 to 2019. The 19th district includes Big Horn County and eastern Park County.

References

1959 births
Living people
Republican Party Wyoming state senators
Brigham Young University alumni
21st-century American politicians
People from Lovell, Wyoming